The Daniel Good's Fording Covered Bridge was a covered bridge located in Lancaster County, Pennsylvania.  It was built in 1855. In 1962 the bridge was used in the construction of the Willow Hill Covered Bridge to supplement the Miller's Farm Covered Bridge from which the Willow Hill covered bridge is derived.  It was located on the border between Pequea Township and Providence Township.

References 

Covered bridges in Lancaster County, Pennsylvania
Bridges completed in 1855
Road bridges in Pennsylvania
1855 establishments in Pennsylvania
Wooden bridges in Pennsylvania
Burr Truss bridges in the United States
1962 disestablishments in Pennsylvania